Buddle is a surname. Notable people with the surname include:

Adam Buddle (1662–1715), English cleric and botanist
Edson Buddle (born 1981), American soccer player
Errol Buddle (1928–2018), Australian multi-instrumentalist
John Buddle (1773–1843), English mining engineer
Thomas Buddle (1812–1883), New Zealand missionary and Methodist leader
Geoffrey Armstrong Buddle (1887–1951)  New Zealand ornithologist and photographer

See also
Buddle pit